Ladybirds (Coccinellidae) are a family of beetles.

Ladybird may also refer to:

Arts and media

Film and television
 The Ladybird (film), a 1927 American silent film
 Ladybird, Ladybird (film), a 1994 UK drama-documentary about a woman losing custody of her four children
 Lady Bird (film), a 2017 American coming-of-age comedy-drama film
 Ladybird (King of the Hill), Hank Hill's dog on King of the Hill

Music

Bands and performers
 The Ladybirds, a British trio most noted for appearing on The Benny Hill Show in the 1960s, 1970s, and 1980s, usually as backup vocals
 The Ladybirds (band), an American retro garage rock band active since 2007
 LadybiRdS, an American pop rock band active since 2005

Songs
 "Ladybird", a track on Everybody Loves a Happy Ending by 1980s British pop band Tears for Fears
 "Ladybird", a track on the album 604 by the band Ladytron
 "Ladybird", a song on the 1983 album Mummer by English band XTC
 Ladybird Ladybird, an English nursery rhyme (also known as Ladybug Ladybug in North America)

Albums
Ladybird (Dexter Gordon album), 1965, released in 2005
Ladybird (Shit and Shine album), 2005

Other uses in arts and media
 The Ladybird , a novella by D. H. Lawrence
 Ladybird Books, a children's book publisher, based in London

Other uses
 Ladybird (clothing), a British children's clothing label sold to Shop Direct
 Ladybird of Szeged (Szegedi Katicabogár), an early robot constructed in Hungary in 1956–1957
 Two species of Eresus, commonly known as "Ladybird spiders"
 HMS Ladybird, one of several ships of the British Royal Navy

See also
 Lady Bird (disambiguation)
 Lady Bug (disambiguation)